
Gmina Strzegowo is a rural gmina (administrative district) in Mława County, Masovian Voivodeship, in east-central Poland.

Villages
Gmina Strzegowo contains the villages and settlements of Adamowo, Aleksandrowo, Augustowo, Baranek, Breginie, Budy Budzkie, Budy Giżyńskie, Budy Kowalewkowskie, Budy Mdzewskie, Budy Polskie, Budy Strzegowskie, Budy Sułkowskie, Budy Wolińskie, Budy-Zofijki, Chądzyny-Krusze, Chądzyny-Kuski, Czarnocin, Czarnocinek, Dąbrowa, Dalnia, Drogiszka, Drogiszka-Tartak, Gatka, Giełczyn, Giełczynek, Giżyn, Giżynek, Huta Emilia, Ignacewo, Józefowo, Konotopa, Kontrewers, Kowalewko, Kozłowo, Kuskowo Kmiece, Kuskowo-Bzury, Kuskowo-Glinki, Łebki, Leszczyna, Mączewo, Marianowo, Marysinek, Mdzewko, Mdzewo, Niedzbórz, Nowa Maryśka, Nowiny Giżyńskie, Nowopole, Parówki, Pokrytki, Prusocin, Radzimowice, Rudowo, Rydzyn Szlachecki, Rydzyn Włościański, Smętne, Stara Maryśka, Staroguby, Strzegowo, Sujki, Sułkowo Borowe, Sułkowo Polne, Syberia, Szachowo, Szymańczyki, Topolewszczyzna, Tuchowo, Unierzyż, Unikowo, Wola Kanigowska, Zabiele and Zalesie.

Neighbouring gminas
Gmina Strzegowo is bordered by the gminas of Ciechanów, Glinojeck, Raciąż, Radzanów, Regimin, Stupsk, Szreńsk and Wiśniewo.

References

Polish official population figures 2006

Strzegowo
Mława County